The Scythian languages ( or  or ) are a group of Eastern Iranian languages of the classical and late antique period (the Middle Iranian period), spoken in a vast region of Eurasia by the populations belonging to the Scythian cultures and their descendants. The dominant ethnic groups among the Scythian-speakers were nomadic pastoralists of Central Asia and the Pontic–Caspian steppe. Fragments of their speech known from inscriptions and words quoted in ancient authors as well as analysis of their names indicate that it was an Indo-European language, more specifically from the Iranian group of Indo-Iranian languages.

Most of the Scythian languages eventually became extinct, except for modern Ossetian (which descends from the Alanian dialect of Scytho-Sarmatian), Wakhi (which descends from the Khotanese and Tumshuqese forms of Scytho-Khotanese), and Yaghnobi (which descends from Sogdian). Alexander Lubotsky summarizes the known linguistic landscape as follows:

Classification 
Ossetian is an  Eastern Iranian language. The vast majority of Scythological scholars agree in considering the Scythian languages a part of the Eastern Iranian languages too. This relies principally on the fact that the Greek inscriptions of the Northern Black Sea Coast contain several hundreds of Sarmatian names showing a close affinity to the Ossetian language.

Some scholars detect a division of Scythian into two dialects: a western, more conservative dialect, and an eastern, more innovative one. The Scythian languages may have formed a dialect continuum:
 Alanian languages or Scytho-Sarmatian in the west: were spoken by people originally of Iranian stock from the 8th and 7th century BC onwards in the area of Ukraine, Southern Russia and Kazakhstan. Modern Ossetian survives as a continuation of the language family possibly represented by Scytho-Sarmatian inscriptions, although the Scytho-Sarmatian language family "does not simply represent the same [Ossetian] language" at an earlier date.

 Saka languages or Scytho-Khotanese in the east: spoken in the first century in the Kingdom of Khotan (located in present-day Xinjiang, China), and including the Khotanese of Khotan and Tumshuqese of Tumshuq.

It is highly probable that already in the Old Iranian period there were some Scythian dialects which gave rise to ancestor(s) of Sogdian language and Yaghnobi, but we have no data that could confirm this theory. (Novák, p.11)

Another East Iranian language is the Chorasmian language.

Phonology
The Scythian language possessed the following phonemes:

History 
Early Eastern Iranians originated in the Yaz culture (ca. 1500–1100 BC) in Central Asia. The Scythians migrated from Central Asia toward Eastern Europe in the 8th and 7th century BC, occupying today's Southern Russia and Ukraine and the Carpathian Basin and parts of Moldova and Dobruja. They disappeared from history after the Hunnish invasion of Europe in the 5th century AD, and Turkic (Avar, Batsange, etc.) and Slavic peoples probably assimilated most people speaking Scythian. However, in the Caucasus, the Ossetian language belonging to the Scythian linguistic continuum remains in use , while in Central Asia, some languages belonging to Eastern Iranian group are still spoken, namely Pashto, Pamir languages and Yaghnobi.

Corpus

Inscriptions 

Some scholars ascribe certain inscribed objects found in the Carpathian Basin and in Central Asia to the Scythians, but the interpretation of these inscriptions remains disputed (given that nobody has definitively identified the alphabet or translated the content).

Saqqez inscription
An inscription from Saqqez, dating from the Scythian presence in Western Asia, and written in the Hieroglyphic Luwian script, may represent Scythian:

Issyk inscription
The Issyk inscription is not yet certainly deciphered, and is probably in a Scythian dialect, constituting one of very few autochthonous epigraphic traces of that language. János Harmatta, using the Kharoṣṭhī script, identified the language as a Khotanese Saka dialect spoken by the Kushans, tentatively translating:

Personal names 

The primary sources for Scythian words remain the Scythian toponyms, tribal names, and numerous personal names in the ancient Greek texts and in the Greek inscriptions found in the Greek colonies on the Northern Black Sea Coast. These names suggest that the Sarmatian language had close similarities to modern Ossetian.

Recorded Scythian personal names include:

Place names
Some scholars believe that many toponyms and hydronyms of the Russian and Ukrainian steppe have Scythian links. For example, Vasmer associates the name of the river Don with an assumed/reconstructed unattested Scythian word *dānu "water, river", and with Avestan dānu-, Pashto dand and Ossetian don.
The river names Don, Donets, Dnieper, Danube, and Dniester, and lake Donuzlav (the deepest one in Crimea) may also belong with the same word-group.

Recorded Scythian place names include:

Herodotus' Scythian etymologies 

The Greek historian Herodotus provides another source of Scythian; he reports that the Scythians called the Amazons Oiorpata, and explains the name as a compound of oior, meaning "man", and pata, meaning "to kill" (Hist. 4,110).

 Most scholars associate oior "man" with Avestan vīra- "man, hero", Sanskrit vīra-, Latin vir (gen. virī) "man, hero, husband", PIE . Various explanations account for pata "kill":
 Persian pat- "(to) kill", patxuste "killed";
 Sogdian pt- "(to) kill", ptgawsty "killed";
 Ossetian fædyn "cleave", Sanskrit pātayati "fell", PIE  "fall".
 Avestan paiti- "lord", Sanskrit páti, PIE , cf. Lat. potestate (i.e. "man-ruler");
 Ossetian maryn "kill", Pashto mrəl, Sanskrit mārayati, PIE  "die" (confusion of Greek Μ and Π);
 Alternatively, one scholar suggests Iranian aiwa- "one" + warah- "breast", the Amazons believed to have removed a breast to aid drawing a bow, according to some ancient folklorists, and as reflected in Greek folk-etymology: a- (privative) + mazos, "without breast".

Elsewhere Herodotus explains the name of the mythical one-eyed tribe Arimaspoi as a compound of the Scythian words arima, meaning "one", and spu, meaning "eye" (Hist. 4,27).

 Some scholars connect arima "one" with Ossetian ærmæst "only", Avestic airime "quiet", Greek erēmos "empty", PIE ?, and spu "eye" with Avestic spas- "foretell", Sanskrit spaś-, PIE  "see".
 However, Iranian usually expresses "one" and "eye" with words like aiwa- and čašman- (Ossetian īw and cæst).
 Other scholars reject Herodotus' etymology and derive the ethnonym Arimaspoi from Iranian aspa- "horse" instead.
 Or the first part of the name may reflect something like Iranian raiwant- "rich", cf. Ossetian riwæ "rich".

Scythian theonyms

Pliny the Elder 
Pliny the Elder's Natural History (AD 77–79) derives the name of the Caucasus from the Scythian kroy-khasis = ice-shining, white with snow (cf. Greek cryos = ice-cold).

Aristophanes

In the comedy works of Aristophanes, the dialects of various Greek people are accurately imitated. In his Thesmophoriazusae, a Scythian archer (a member of a police force in Athens) speaks broken Greek, consistently omitting the final -s and -n, using the lenis in place of the aspirate, and once using ks in place of s (sigma); these may be used to elucidate the Scythian languages.

Alanian 
The Alanian language as spoken by the Alans from about the 5th to the 11th centuries AD formed a dialect directly descended from the earlier Scytho-Sarmatian languages, and forming in its turn the ancestor of the Ossetian language. Byzantine Greek authors recorded only a few fragments of this language.

See also 
 Getae
 Dacian language

Notes

Bibliography 

 
 Harmatta, J.: Studies in the History and Language of the Sarmatians, Szeged 1970.
 
 
 Humbach, Helmut & Klaus Faiss. Herodotus’s Scythians and Ptolemy’s Central Asia: Semasiological and Onomasiological Studies. Wiesbaden: Dr. Ludwig Reichert Verlag, 2012
 
 Mayrhofer, M.: Einiges zu den Skythen, ihrer Sprache, ihrem Nachleben. Vienna 2006.
 
 .
 
 Zgusta, L.: Die griechischen Personennamen griechischer Städte der nördlichen Schwarzmeerküste. Die ethnischen Verhältnisse, namentlich das Verhältnis der Skythen und Sarmaten, im Lichte der Namenforschung, Prague 1955.

Eastern Iranian languages
Extinct languages of Asia
Extinct languages of Europe
Languages attested from the 1st millennium BC
Scythians
Sarmatians
History of Ural